Paulo César Arango Ambuila  is a retired Colombian midfielder, who last played for Caracas in the Venezuelan Primera Division.

External links
 
 Official Site
 

1984 births
Living people
Colombian footballers
Colombian expatriate footballers
Categoría Primera A players
Categoría Primera B players
Venezuelan Primera División players
América de Cali footballers
Real Cartagena footballers
Envigado F.C. players
Atlético Junior footballers
La Equidad footballers
Atlético Bucaramanga footballers
Caracas FC players
Expatriate footballers in Venezuela
Association football midfielders
Colombia international footballers
People from Palmira, Valle del Cauca
Sportspeople from Valle del Cauca Department
21st-century Colombian people